Aalesunds Fotballklubb, commonly known as Aalesund or AaFK, is a Norwegian football club from the town of Ålesund, that competes in the Eliteserien, the first tier of the Norwegian football league system. The club was founded on 25 June 1914. As of 2004, the football club had 835 members and several teams on both professional and amateur levels. These teams are the 1st and 2nd teams, junior team, and also several age-specific teams.

History
In 2009 the club won the Norwegian Cup for the first time in its history. They beat rival Molde FK in the Final, and thereby qualified for participation in the UEFA Europa League. Aalesund also won the 2011 Cup Final, where they beat SK Brann.

Recent domestic
{|class="wikitable"
|-bgcolor="#efefef"
! Season
!
! Pos.
! Pl.
! W
! D
! L
! GS
! GA
! P
!Cup
!Notes
|-
|2001
|1. divisjon
|align=right |6
|align=right|30||align=right|13||align=right|8||align=right|9
|align=right|65||align=right|51||align=right|47
|Third round
|
|-
|2002
|1. divisjon
|align=right bgcolor=#DDFFDD| 2
|align=right|30||align=right|19||align=right|7||align=right|4
|align=right|77||align=right|26||align=right|64
|Semi-final
|Promoted to the Tippeligaen
|-
|2003
|Tippeligaen
|align=right bgcolor="#FFCCCC"| 13
|align=right|26||align=right|7||align=right|7||align=right|12
|align=right|30||align=right|33||align=right|28
|Quarter-final
|Relegated to the 1. divisjon
|-
|2004
|1. divisjon
|align=right bgcolor=#DDFFDD| 2
|align=right|30||align=right|21||align=right|1||align=right|8
|align=right|67||align=right|36||align=right|64
|Third round
|Promoted to the Tippeligaen
|-
|2005
|Tippeligaen
|align=right bgcolor="#FFCCCC"| 13
|align=right|26||align=right|6||align=right|9||align=right|11
|align=right|30||align=right|42||align=right|27
|Fourth round
|Relegated to the 1. divisjon
|-
|2006
|1. divisjon
|align=right bgcolor=#DDFFDD| 2
|align=right|30||align=right|17||align=right|9||align=right|4
|align=right|71||align=right|35||align=right|60
|Fourth round
|Promoted to the Tippeligaen
|-
|2007
|Tippeligaen
|align=right |11
|align=right|26||align=right|9||align=right|3||align=right|14
|align=right|49||align=right|56||align=right|30
|Fourth round
|
|-
|2008
|Tippeligaen
|align=right |13
|align=right|26||align=right|7||align=right|4||align=right|15
|align=right|29||align=right|42||align=right|25
|Fourth round
|
|-
|2009
|Tippeligaen
|align=right |13
|align=right|30||align=right|9||align=right|9||align=right|12
|align=right|34||align=right|43||align=right|36
|bgcolor=gold|Winner
|
|-
|2010
|Tippeligaen
|align=right |4
|align=right|30||align=right|14||align=right|5||align=right|11
|align=right|46||align=right|37||align=right|47
|Third round
|Europa League Third qualifying round
|-
|2011
|Tippeligaen
|align=right |9
|align=right|30||align=right|12||align=right|7||align=right|11
|align=right|36||align=right|38||align=right|43
|bgcolor=gold|Winner
|Europa League Play-off round
|-
|2012
|Tippeligaen
|align=right |11
|align=right|30||align=right|9||align=right|11||align=right|10
|align=right|40||align=right|41||align=right|38
|Fourth round
|Europa League Third qualifying round
|-
|2013
|Tippeligaen
|align=right |4
|align=right|30||align=right|14||align=right|7||align=right|9
|align=right|55||align=right|44||align=right|49
|Third round
|
|-
|2014
|Tippeligaen
|align=right |7
|align=right|30||align=right|11||align=right|8||align=right|11
|align=right|40||align=right|39||align=right|41
|Fourth round
|
|-
|2015
|Tippeligaen
|align=right |10
|align=right|30||align=right|11||align=right|5||align=right|14
|align=right|42||align=right|57||align=right|38
|Third round
|
|-
|2016 
|Tippeligaen
|align=right |9
|align=right|30||align=right|12||align=right|6||align=right|12
|align=right|46||align=right|51||align=right|42
|Third round
|
|-
|2017
|Eliteserien
|align=right bgcolor="#FFCCCC"| 15
|align=right|30||align=right|8||align=right|8||align=right|14
|align=right|38||align=right|50||align=right|32
|Fourth round
|Relegated to 1. divisjon
|-
|2018 
|1. divisjon
|align=right |3
|align=right|30||align=right|18||align=right|5||align=right|7
|align=right|58||align=right|31||align=right|59
|First round
|
|-
|2019 
|1. divisjon
|align=right bgcolor=#DDFFDD| 1
|align=right|30||align=right|25||align=right|4||align=right|1
|align=right|67||align=right|25||align=right|79
|Quarter-final
||Promoted to Eliteserien
|-
|2020  
|Eliteserien
|align=right bgcolor="#FFCCCC"| 16
|align=right|30||align=right|2||align=right|5||align=right|23
|align=right|30||align=right|85||align=right|11
|Cancelled
|Relegated to 1. divisjon
|-
|2021 
|1. divisjon
|align=right bgcolor=#DDFFDD| 2
|align=right|30||align=right|16||align=right|10||align=right|4
|align=right|68||align=right|43||align=right|58
|Fourth round
|Promoted to Eliteserien
|-
|2022 
|Eliteserien
|align=right |9
|align=right|30||align=right|10||align=right|9||align=right|11
|align=right|32||align=right|45||align=right|39
|Third round
|
|}

European

Supporters
The local supporter club for AaFK is called "Stormen", or "The Storm", with about 2000 members.

Rivalries
Rival football clubs in the city include Herd, Rollon, Skarbøvik and Spjelkavik, with Molde and Hødd traditionally being the main regional rivals. Hødd has been less competitive with AaFK in recent years, as they have not been in the same division for some time. More recent rivalries have centred on Molde and Strømsgodset, and to some extent Brann.

The club's supporters enjoy a good relationship with supporters of Oslo club Vålerenga, and it is not uncommon for supporters of one club to support the other in competitions where only one team participates. In the 2011 game against Neath in Wales, some supporters of 2010's Europa League opponents Motherwell also made their way to support the club.

Stadium

Aalesund played their home matches at Kråmyra Stadium until the 2005 season, when they relocated to the new Color Line Stadium with an approximate capacity of 11,000 people. Boosted by the new stadium, recent success and general increasing attendance in Norway, Aalesund has gone from attracting crowds of approximately 1,000 to regularly selling out their stadium  in only a few years. Their average attendance of 9,943 in the 2006 1. divisjon became at the time a new record for attendances at the second tier of the Norwegian league system.

Current squad

Out on loan

Club officials
Sporting Development Manager: Bjørn Erik Melland
Head coach: Lars Arne Nilsen
Assistant coach: Roger Naustan
Assistant coach: Kristoffer Lie
Goalkeeper coach: Frank Mathiesen
Reserve team head coach: Amund Skiri

Managers
 Bobby Gould
 Egil "Drillo" Olsen (1989)
 Eivind Syversen (19??–93)
 Knut Torbjørn Eggen (1994–96)
 Bård Wiggen (1 July 1997 – 30 June 1999)
 Geir Hansen (2000)
 Ivar Morten Normark (1 January 2002 – 31 December 2005)
 Per Joar Hansen (1 January 2006 – 31 December 2007)
 Sören Åkeby (1 January 2008 – 31 August 2008)
 Kjetil Rekdal (5 September 2008 – 26 November 2012)
 Jan Jönsson (8 January 2013 – 31 December 2014)
 Harald Aabrekk (1 January 2015 – 28 April 2015)
 Trond Fredriksen (28 April 2015 – 12 December 2017)
 Lars Bohinen (20 December 2017 – 23 August 2020)
 Lars Arne Nilsen (25 August 2020 –)

Honours

League
1. divisjon
Champions (1): 2019

Cup
Norwegian Cup
Champions (2): 2009, 2011

History of league positions (since 1963)

References

External links

 Official website
 Stormen Fanclub Site

 
Association football clubs established in 1914
1914 establishments in Norway
Eliteserien clubs
Sport in Ålesund
Companies based in Ålesund